The Malta International Tournament was a biannual association football friendly competition for national teams organised by the Malta Football Association that took place in Malta between 1986 and 2008. Initially, the tournament included the participation of football clubs, but starting from 1988 this was revamped to include only national A teams.

Usually played in February, the competition involved a single round-robin phase where each team played once against each other. Teams are ranked by points and at the end of the competition, the team with the most points is crowned champion. Up till 2004, the competition was sponsored by Rothmans and was known as the Rothmans Tournament for sponsorship reasons.

Summary

Malta Women's Tournament

All-time top goalscorers

Hat-tricks

References

 
International association football competitions hosted by Malta
Maltese football friendly trophies
1986 establishments in Malta
Malta
Malta
2008 disestablishments in Malta
International women's association football invitational tournaments